Seri's sheath-tailed bat (Emballonura serii) is a species of sac-winged bat in the family Emballonuridae. It is found in the Bismarck Archipelago of Papua New Guinea and Yapen Island in Indonesia. Its roosts in caves.

References

Emballonura
Bats of Oceania
Bats of Indonesia
Mammals of Papua New Guinea
Mammals of Western New Guinea
Bismarck Archipelago
Yapen Islands
Least concern biota of Asia
Least concern biota of Oceania
Mammals described in 1994
Taxonomy articles created by Polbot
Bats of New Guinea